The MAC 50 (also known as MAC 1950, MAS 50 or PA modèle 1950) is a standard semi-automatic pistol of the French army and adopted in 1950. It replaced the previous series of French pistols, the Modèle 1935A & Modèle 1935S, and was produced between 1950 and 1970.

It was first made by MAC (Manufacture d'armes de Châtellerault) then by MAS (Manufacture d'Armes St. Etienne - two of several government-owned arms factories in France)

It is now superseded by the PAMAS G1, the French version of the Beretta 92, and since 2020 by the 5th-generation Glock 17.

History
In Châtellerault, 221,900 were made until it was closed in 1963 with production continuing in St. Etienne with 120,000 pistols would be made by 1978.

Design
It uses the Browning system like the FN GP 35 with an integral barrel feed ramp, it is a single-action trigger with slide mounted safety that locks the firing pin so the hammer can be lowered by pressing the trigger with safety engaged.

The MAC-50 is primarily based on the Modèle 1935S, for which MAC was the primary manufacturer, although it shares some characteristics with the Modèle 1935A, the design basis for the SIG P210 (SIG licensed the Modèle 1935A design from SACM in 1937).

Users

: Armée de Terre and 

 French Armed Forces
 Police Nationale

References

Infantry weapons of the Cold War
Cold War weapons of France
Semi-automatic pistols of France
9mm Parabellum semi-automatic pistols
Military equipment introduced in the 1950s